Mini Brands is an American toy brand. The brand consists of a series of miniature toys, many of which advertise real-life brands such as Tapatio, Hershey's and others. In 2019 they launched Mini Brands. In 2020 they launched Series 2 and Toys Mini Brands. In 2021 they launched Toys Series 2, Series 3, and Disney Pixar Marvel Mini Brands. In 2022 they launched Series 4 and Foodies, which include fast food like Subway, the fast food brand.

Produced by a toy company named Zuru, the toys are distributed from Washington, D.C. Mini Brands has several competitor brands on the markets.

References 

Toy brands
2010s establishments in the United States